Reef Karim is a television personality, international speaker, author, and osteopathic physician. He is best known as the host of the Court TV television show House of Clues, the host of the Discovery Fit & Health television show Broken Minds, a recurring guest expert on the television show Outrageous Acts of Psych, from Discovery Science, and the comedic host, writer and producer of Karim Madness.

Karim has appeared on Oprah, Dr. Oz, Dr. Phil, The Today Show, Chelsea Lately, and regularly appears on CNN as a medical and psychiatric commentator. He has written articles for the Huffington Post, Oprah.com, and Fox.com. He has also had minor roles in television shows like Lost Transmissions (2019) and Veep (2017).

In 2004, Karim was named one of "The Sexiest Men Alive" by People magazine.

Early life
Karim earned a B.S. degree from the University of Illinois at Urbana-Champaign. In 1996, he graduated cum laude with a D.O. from University of Health Sciences (now Kansas City University of Medicine and Biosciences). He subsequently completed a joint internship in internal medicine/psychiatry/neurology, a residency in psychiatry, and a fellowship in addiction medicine, all at UCLA. Karim also completed the professional program in television and feature film writing at the UCLA School of Theater, Film and Television.

Medical career
Karim is an assistant clinical professor of psychiatry at the UCLA Semel Institute for Neuroscience and Senior Attending Physician at the Ronald Reagan UCLA Medical Center. He is also the founder and medical director of The Control Center, an integrated outpatient addiction treatment center in Beverly Hills, California.

Media
Karim is a well known guest expert, actor and writer in the media. He has co-authored a dating book titled Why Does he do that? Why does she do that?. He is a contributor for the Huffington Post, and his work has been profiled in Forbes and the Christian Science Monitor.

As an actor, Karim played the lead in the Indie movie Flavors, with supporting roles in Lost Transmissions (2019) (with Simon Pegg), Laurel Canyon (2002) (with Christian Bale), Veep (2017) (with Julia Louis Dreyfus), Lords of Dogtown (2005) (with Heath Ledger), Claire's Cambodia and appeared in The Breakup Girl(2015), Fit to Be Tied (2014), Posey (2012), Goodbye My Friend (2011), The Whisperers (2009), Night of Henna (2005), Russians in the City of Angels (2003), and Flavors (2004). He has also hosted multiple television shows, including Outrageous Acts of Psych, Broken Minds and House of Clues. Karim has also appeared on The Oprah Winfrey Show, The Dr. Oz Show, Dr. Phil, Hollywood Today, ABC World News Tonight, Larry King Live and Anderson Cooper 360°.

On May 26, 2012, Karim was a guest panelist at Psychology In Action and UCLA's "Psychology On The Big Screen," for his work as psychiatric consultant on the films Thirteen, The Bourne Identity, and the television shows Private Practice and Alias.

Filmography

TV Roles

References

External links
Dr. Karim Home Page
Karim Madness Home Page
The Control Center
Little Boy Big Suit Home Page

American male actors of Indian descent
American Muslims
American psychiatrists
Television personalities from Los Angeles
Living people
David Geffen School of Medicine at UCLA faculty
American people of Indian descent in health professions
Year of birth missing (living people)
American osteopathic physicians